Leonard F. Bersani (November 21, 1932 – April 12, 2000) was an American politician who served in the New York State Assembly from the 118th district from 1969 to 1974 and from 1977 to 1980.

References

1932 births
2000 deaths
Republican Party members of the New York State Assembly
20th-century American politicians